Green rice may refer to:

Cốm, a Vietnamese green rice dish
Arroz poblano, a Mexican green rice dish